ACEFEST (American Cinematic Experience Film Festival - formerly known as the ACE Film Festival) is a film festival first held in 2007 in New York City. The festival focuses purely on showcasing domestic films "in an effort to strengthen and promote pride in American independent cinema".

The festival screens premieres of American video art, animation, short films, student films, documentaries and feature films. Band performances, interactive media showcases, games, contests and giveaways are also held.

2009 ACEFEST 

The 2009 ACEFEST took place July 10–11, 2009, at Tribeca Cinemas in Manhattan's Financial District. While the event was a scaled down iteration of the typically three- to four-day event, it was the fest's most successful to date.

Winners

 Best Short Film: Open Air – directed by Shira-Lee Shalit 
 Best Feature Film: How I Got Lost – directed by Joe Leonard 
 Best Documentary Film: Skatopia: 88 Acres of Anarchy – directed by  Lauri House 
 Audience Choice Award: The Human Experience – directed by Charles Kinnane

Judges
Lloyd Kaufman - Director, "Toxic Avenger ", co-founder Troma Entertainment 
Chris Gore - Founder FilmThreat.com, writer "Ultimate Film Festival Survival Guide", G4TV co-host
Elle Martini - Emmy-nominated writer/director
Zenon Kruszelnicki - Acting Coach, Willem Dafoe, New York Film Academy
Gabriele Barrera - Writer, international film critic 
Russell Hess - Distributor/Producer

2008 ACE Film Festival 

The 2008 ACE Film Festival took place from September 4 to the 7th 2008, at New World Stages, 343 West 49th Street, down the street from world-famous Times Square. ACEFest's longtime supporter, New York Foundation for the Arts, held the honor of being the official presenter of that year's event. NYFA, a non-for-profit organization, has supported emerging filmmakers since 1976 and offers a wide variety of programs, including Fiscal Sponsorship, Artists' Fellowships, and NYFA Source.

The final programming included 40 films of all genres and lengths, including video art, animation, music videos, documentaries, and narrative-based shorts and feature-length films. Of all of those, 4 were World Premieres, 10 were East Coast Premieres, and 12 were New York City Premieres.

Winners

 Best Short Film: Person, Place or Thing – directed by Elle Martini 
 Best Feature Film: Remarkable Power! – directed by Brandon Beckner 
 Best Documentary Film: Second Skin – directed by Juan Carlos Peneiro 
 Audience Choice Award: Looking For Ms.Locklear – directed by Link Neal and Rhett McLaughlin

Judges
 Murphy Gilson - Producer, PBS, Comedy Central. Two Emmy winner
 William Ericsson Crawley - Founder, WEMA International Talent Agency
 Colin Boyd - Critic, BigPictureRadio.com
 Claudia Jean - PR, HBO, BET, Nickelodeon, MTV, Showtime and TLC
 David Nusair - Critic, Reel Film Reviews
 Jim Connors - Broadcasting, ThinkBright TV Network

2007 ACE Film Festival 

The inaugural ACE Film Festival took place from August 24 to 26 at the Broad Street Ballroom, 41 Broad Street, right in the center of Manhattan's Financial District and in close proximity to the New York Stock Exchange. One of the upper floors on the venue was transformed into "Club Ace", a networking lounge where a variety of activities took place.The independent director Caveh Zahedi, was a guest speaker.

A portion of the festival's ticket proceeds were donated to the New York Foundation for the Arts in an effort to support its efforts in "spreading the gift of creativity." The festival was also part of the River to River Festival, the "largest annual cultural and arts event in New York City's history."

Among the films screened was Robert Liano's and Tom Coppola's A Broad Way, a documentary film shot over the period of one hour by more than 400 filmmakers, dispersed along 258 blocks of New York City's famous Broadway.

Winners

 Best Short Film: The Doorstep – directed by Brian Paul and Jason Nacey 
 Best Feature Film: Little Chenier – directed by Bethany Ashton Wolf 
 Best Documentary Film: A Broad Way – directed by Robert Liano and Tom Coppola 
 Best Animated Film: The Cocktail Party – directed by Brandon Duncan

References

External links
 ACEFEST - Official Website

Film festivals in New York City
Festivals in Manhattan
Student film festivals